Gilley's Complex, known as Gilley's Dallas, is a multi-purpose entertainment and dining complex located in Dallas, Texas. The complex offers nine venues with capacities ranging from 350 to 4,000.  These venues are: South Side Ballroom, South Side Music Hall, the Loft, Bonnie & Clyde’s, the Lone Star Room, the Brazos Room, the Saloon, the Pasadena Room, and the Federal Reserve Room. The complex was named for country music singer-songwriter Mickey Gilley, who performed at the club.

On July 7, 2019, Impact Wrestling held Slammiversary XVII in the venue.

References

Concert halls in Dallas
Concert halls in Texas
Music venues in Dallas
Downtown Dallas
Performing arts centers in Texas
Texas classical music
Landmarks in Dallas